The commune of Kiremba is a commune of Ngozi Province in northern Burundi. The capital lies at Kiremba.

References

Communes of Burundi
Ngozi Province